The Charitable Irish Society of Boston was founded in 1737 and is the oldest Irish organization in North America. Its early charitable efforts focused around providing temporary loans and assistance in finding work to Irish immigrants.

The society was incorporated in 1809 and established a constitution in 1810.

Involvement in the first St. Patrick's Day

The society organized the first observance of St. Patrick's Day in the Thirteen Colonies.

Surprisingly, the celebration was not Catholic in nature, Irish immigration to the colonies having been dominated by Protestants. The society's purpose in gathering was simply to honour its homeland, and although they continued to meet annually to coordinate charitable works for the Irish community in Boston, they did not meet on 17 March again until 1794. During the observance of the day, individuals attended a service of worship and a special dinner.

Notable members
Patrick A. Collins
James Michael Curley
Patrick Donohoe
John F. Fitzgerald
Hugh O'Brien
John C. Park
James McGee
Daniel Malcolm
Peter Pelham
Robert Auchmuty

See also 
Charitable Irish Society of Halifax

References

External links
 

Irish-American organizations
Irish-American culture in Boston
Clubs and societies in Boston
1737 establishments in Massachusetts
Organizations established in 1737
Philanthropic organizations based in the United States